Nenavali Caves, also Khadsamble Caves, are located at Sudhagad at Raigad, India. This is group of 37 Buddhist caves about 35 km from Pali, carved in first century B.C.

References

 

Buddhist caves in India
Caves of Maharashtra
Indian rock-cut architecture
Former populated places in India
Buddhist pilgrimage sites in India
Caves containing pictograms in India